The Old Saxon Baptismal Vow, also called the Old Saxon Catechism, Utrecht Baptismal Vow and Abrenuntiatio Diaboli, is a baptismal vow that was found in a ninth-century manuscript in a monastery library in Mainz, Germany. The vow mentions three Germanic pagan gods of the early Saxons which the reader is to forsake: Uuôden ("Woden"), Thunaer and Saxnōt. Scholar Rudolf Simek comments that the vow is of particular interest because it is the sole instance of the god Saxnōt mentioned in a religious context. One of many baptismal vows, it is now archived in the Vatican Codex pal. 577.

Not withstanding the conventional name of the text, there is a dispute as to how the language of the text should be categorised, as it shows features of Old English, Old Low Franconian (Old Dutch) and Old Saxon (Old Low German).

The Vow
The text (with Latin italicised) runs as follows:

Language dispute
While the manuscript of the vow is ninth-century, its language seems to be from the eighth. It is undoubtedly written in a mix of different West Germanic dialects, including features that could belong to Old High German, Old Low German, Old Saxon, Old Frisian, Old Dutch (also known as Old Low Franconian), and Old English. This has led to extensive debate about where the text originated, not least because the text would stand as an important early monument to the language and traditions of whatever modern country can claim it — yet it is possible that none of these distinctions seemed very important to the people who copied and adapted the text. Key layers seem to be:

 Old English (probably specifically Northumbrian Old English). This would be consistent with production in Northumbria, or by a Northumbrian missionary active alongside Saint Boniface on the Continent.
 Old Saxon or Old Dutch, which could be consistent with production at or transmission via a monastery at Utrecht (in the modern Netherlands).
 Old High German, which would be consistent with copying of the surviving manuscript by a speaker of this variety, perhaps at Hersfeld Abbey.

Comparison to present-day Dutch and Low German
In the glossary below, the spelling has been normalised:
  is replaced with  when a consonant

Editions 

 Capitularia Regum Francorum I, ed. by A. Boretius, Monumenta Germaniae Historica, Legum sectio 11 (Hanover, 1883), p. 22 (no. 107)
 'Abrenuntiatio diaboli et prefessio fidei', ed. by E. Wadstein, Kleinere altsächsische Sprachdenkmäler, Niederdeutsche Denkmäler, 6 (Norden: Soltau, 1899), pp. 119–21
 Hodgkin, R. H., A History of the Anglo-Saxons, 3rd edn., 2 vols (Oxford, 1952), I, 302 [facsimile]

See also
Indiculus superstitionum et paganiarum, a Latin collection of capitularies identifying and condemning superstitious and pagan beliefs found in the north of Gaul and among the Saxons during the time of their subjugation and conversion by Charlemagne

References

Sources

Simek, Rudolf (1993), 'Saxon Baptismal Vow', in Dictionary of Northern Mythology, trans. by Angela Hall. D.S. Brewer. p. 276. 

Germanic paganism
Germanic Christianity
Old Saxon
Old Dutch
Baptism
Manuscripts of the Vatican Library
Culture in Mainz
9th-century manuscripts